Greg Sharpe (born 1956) is an American politician. He is a member of the Missouri House of Representatives from the 4th District, serving since 2019. He is a member of the Republican party.

Electoral history

State Representative
 Greg Sharpe was unopposed in the Republican primary elections of 2018, 2020, and 2022.

References

Living people
1956 births
Republican Party members of the Missouri House of Representatives
21st-century American politicians